Duduzile Patricia Sibiya (born 1 July 1957) is a South African politician and a Member of the National Assembly of South Africa. She is a member of the African National Congress (ANC).

Education
Sibiya only attended high school until Grade 11. She holds no tertiary qualifications.

Political career
As a member of the African National Congress, Sibiya has been a member of the provincial executive committee (PEC) of the African National Congress Women's League since 1997.

Parliament
In 2011, Sibiya was elected to the National Assembly of South Africa as a member of the African National Congress. She was appointed to the Portfolio Committee on Police. Prior to the 2014 elections, Sibiya was number 35 on the ANC's list in KwaZulu-Natal. She was not elected to return to the National Assembly.

Sibiya stood as a parliamentary candidate and a candidate for the provincial legislature in the 2019 national and provincial elections. She was elected to the National Assembly. Since returning to the National Assembly, she has been a member of the Portfolio Committee on Higher Education, Science and Technology.

Personal life
Sibiya's interests include singing, gardening and reading.

References

External links

Living people
1957 births
Zulu people
People from KwaZulu-Natal
African National Congress politicians
Members of the National Assembly of South Africa
Women members of the National Assembly of South Africa